The Technicians were a short lived Australian group formed in the mid-1980s. The group released three singles, two of which peaked inside the Australian top 100.

Discography

Singles

References

Australian pop music groups
Musical groups established in 1986
Musical groups disestablished in 1988